Massey Drive  (2021 pop.: 1,606) is a Canadian town located on the west coast of the island of Newfoundland in the province of Newfoundland and Labrador.  Its name is derived from the original road through the town, named Massey Drive, which in turn is named after Vincent Massey, former Governor General of Canada (1952–59).  It is adjacent to the city of Corner Brook, from which it seceded in 1971. It is primarily a residential area.

Demographics 

References

External links

Towns in Newfoundland and Labrador